The Cukra climbing salamander (Bolitoglossa striatula) is a species of salamander in the family Plethodontidae.
It is found in Costa Rica, Honduras, and Nicaragua.
Its natural habitats are subtropical or tropical moist lowland forests, subtropical or tropical moist montane forests, freshwater marshes, and plantations .
It is threatened by habitat loss.

References

Bolitoglossa
Taxonomy articles created by Polbot
Amphibians described in 1918